Richard Case (born 1964) is an American comics artist best known for his work for DC Comics especially the Vertigo imprint.

He is not to be confused with the similarly-named Richard Case, a comics artist who worked for the Iger Studio and Fiction House in the 1940s.

Career
After receiving a Bachelor of Fine Arts degree from the Rhode Island School of Design, Richard Case worked as an assistant to comics artist Walt Simonson in 1985. Case's first credited published comic book story appeared in Marvel Comics' Strange Tales vol. 2 #10 (Jan. 1988). He moved to DC Comics and pencilled the majority of issues of Grant Morrison's run on Doom Patrol beginning with issue #19 (Feb. 1989). In 1992, he drew several issues of Darkhold: Pages from the Book of Sins for Marvel. Back at DC, Case inked Marc Hempel's pencils on the Sandman story "The Kindly Ones" and penciled a few pages in Hempel's style. He illustrated Jamie Delano's Ghostdancing limited series, the final story arc of Peter Milligan's Shade, the Changing Man, and Hunter: The Age of Magic with Dylan Horrocks. Since leaving the comics industry, he has worked extensively in computer game illustration especially for Ubisoft.

Bibliography

DC Comics

 The Books of Magic vol. 2 #48, inks (1998) 
 DC One Million 80–Page Giant #1, inks (1999) 
 Deadenders #1–8, inks (2000) 
 Doom Force Special #1, inks (1992) 
 Doom Patrol vol. 2 #19–24, 26–35, 37–41, 44, 46–52, 54–57, 59–66 (1989–1993) 
 Flinch #15, inks (2000) 
 Gemini Blood #3–4, inks (1996) 
 Ghostdancing #1–6 (1995) 
 Hunter: The Age of Magic #1–6, 8–25 (2001–2003) 
 Legends of the DC Universe #15–17 (The Flash) (1999) 
 The Names of Magic #1–5 (2001) 
 Preacher Special: The Story of You-Know-Who #1 (1996) 
 Sandman #65–68, inks (1994–1995) 
 Sandman Mystery Theatre #46–48, 57–60, inks (1997–1998) 
 Shade, the Changing Man vol. 2 #61–63, 65–70 (1995–1996) 
 Starman: The Mist #1 (1998) 
 Totems #1, inks (2000) 
 Vertigo: Winter's Edge #3, inks (2000)
 Who's Who in the DC Universe #1, 3, 6–7, 9–11, 15 (1990–1992)
 Wonder Woman Gallery #1 (one page) (1996)

Image Comics
 Gen 13 Bikini Pin-Up Special #1 (one page) (1997)

Marvel Comics

 Cable #73, 75, 77, 79, inks (1999–2000) 
 Darkhold: Pages from the Book of Sins #1–2, 5–6 (1992–1993) 
 Deathlok vol. 3 #6 (2000) 
 Doctor Strange, Sorcerer Supreme #1–4 (1988–1989) 
 Fantastic Four vol. 2 #13, inks (1997) 
 Marvel Super Hero Island Adventures #1, inks (1999)
 Nighthawk #1–3 (1998) 
 The Sensational Spider-Man #8–11, 13–17, -1, 19–20, 22–23, 27–28, 31 (1996–1998) 
 Spider-Man: Death and Destiny #1–3, inks (2000) 
 Strange Tales vol. 2 #10–11, 13–19 (Doctor Strange) (1988) 
 Wolverine '96 #1, inks (1996)

References

External links

Richard Case at Mike's Amazing World of Comics
Richard Case at the Unofficial Handbook of Marvel Comics Creators

1964 births
20th-century American artists
21st-century American artists
American comics artists
Comics inkers
DC Comics people
Living people
Marvel Comics people
Rhode Island School of Design alumni
Video game artists
Date of birth missing (living people)
Place of birth missing (living people)